Deltophalonia chlidonibrya is a species of moth of the family Tortricidae. It is found in Ecuador (Morona-Santiago Province, Loja Province) and Colombia.

References

Moths described in 2003
Cochylini